David Stone (February 17, 1770October 7, 1818) was the 15th governor of the U.S. state of North Carolina from 1808 to 1810. Both before and after his term as governor, he served as a U.S. senator, between 1801 and 1807 and between 1813 and 1814.

Biography
Stone was born in Bertie County in the Province of North Carolina, the son of planter and politician Zedekiah Stone. He attended Windsor Academy and later the College of New Jersey, where he graduated with honors. Returning to North Carolina, Stone studied law in Halifax and was granted his law license in 1790.  He married Hannah Turner and began the construction of a large manor house on land given him by his father, Zedekiah Stone.  This is now a historic site, Hope Plantation.

In 1789, Stone was a member of the convention in Fayetteville which ratified the United States Constitution. He proceeded to represent Bertie County in the North Carolina House of Commons until 1795, when he was named to the North Carolina Superior Court.

In 1798, Stone stepped down from the court to serve in the United States House of Representatives for one term; during the contested 1800 presidential election, he cast his vote for Thomas Jefferson when the election was sent to the House for a final decision.

Re-elected in a bid for a second term in the House, Stone resigned when he was elected to the United States Senate by the North Carolina General Assembly in late 1800. He sat as a justice of the Bertie County Court in the early 1800s, including the 1802 scare over a slave rebellion in Bertie County.  He resigned his seat in the Senate in 1807 to return to the state Superior Court, but was there for only a year before being elected Governor of North Carolina by the legislature in November 1808.

As Governor, Stone was an ardent supporter of agricultural and industrial development, as well as of the expansion to the education system to both sexes and all social classes. Stone was re-elected in 1809 but was defeated for a third one-year term in 1810 by Benjamin Smith. Following his defeat, Stone served in the North Carolina House of Commons for a year before being named to the U.S. Senate once again in 1813.

Stone's second term in the U.S. Senate lasted only a year; he was censured by the NC General Assembly for failing to support the administration during the War of 1812. Stone resigned his Senate seat in December 1814, retiring to his Wake County plantation, where he died in 1818 and is buried.

References

National Governors Association
OurCampaigns.com
Historic Hope Plantation

1770 births
1818 deaths
Members of the North Carolina House of Representatives
United States senators from North Carolina
North Carolina state court judges
Governors of North Carolina
People from Bertie County, North Carolina
Democratic-Republican Party United States senators
Democratic-Republican Party members of the United States House of Representatives from North Carolina
Democratic-Republican Party state governors of the United States
18th-century American politicians
19th-century American politicians
Princeton University alumni
18th-century American lawyers